Lionel Keith Murphy QC (30 August 1922 – 21 October 1986) was an Australian politician, barrister, and judge. He was a Senator for New South Wales from 1962 to 1975, serving as Attorney-General in the Whitlam Government, and then sat on the High Court from 1975 until his death.

Murphy was born in Sydney, and attended Sydney Boys High School before matriculating at the University of Sydney. He initially graduated with a degree in chemistry, but then went on to Sydney Law School and eventually became a barrister. He specialised in labour and industrial law, and took silk in 1960. Murphy was elected to the Senate at the 1961 federal election, as a member of the Labor Party. He became Leader of the Opposition in the Senate in 1967.

Following Labor's victory at the 1972 federal election, Gough Whitlam appointed Murphy as Attorney-General and Minister for Customs and Excise. He oversaw a number of reforms, establishing the Family Court of Australia, the Law Reform Commission, and the Australian Institute of Criminology, and developing the Family Law Act 1975, which fully established no-fault divorce. He also authorised the 1973 Murphy raids on ASIO. In 1975, following the death of Douglas Menzies, Murphy was appointed to the High Court. He is the most recent politician to be appointed to the court.

On the court, Murphy was known for his radicalism and judicial activism. However, his final years were marred by persistent allegations of corruption. He was convicted of perverting the course of justice in 1985, but had the conviction overturned on appeal and was acquitted at a second trial. In 1986, a commission was established to determine whether he was fit to remain on the court, but it was abandoned when Murphy announced that he was suffering from terminal cancer.

Early life and education
Murphy was the youngest of five sons, and sixth of seven children of William, a native of County Tipperary, and Lily Murphy. He was born and grew up in Sydney. Though the Murphy household was Irish Catholic, albeit estranged from the Church, Murphy became a humanist and rationalist.

He was educated at government schools in Sydney's south-eastern suburbs, including Kensington Public School in Kensington, where he was dux after repeating his final year in 1935, and Sydney Boys High School from 1936–40 in nearby Moore Park, graduating with A levels in English, Mathematics, and Chemistry and B levels in Physics and French. After completing his secondary education, in 1941, Murphy matriculated to the University of Sydney, though he had not been successful in gaining a university scholarship awarded to the top 100 in the state. His initial scholastic performance was ordinary and he briefly considered transferring to study a Bachelor of Arts majoring in psychology at the Faculty of Arts. 

Murphy excelled in his final year, graduating from the School of Chemistry, Faculty of Science with a Bachelor of Science with Honours in Organic Chemistry. In 1943, he commenced working in the chemical industry, thereby coming under the authority of the wartime Manpower Directorate.

In 1945, Murphy commenced studying law at the Sydney Law School of the University of Sydney and, in 1949, graduated with a Bachelor of Laws with Honours. While at the University of Sydney, during both his science and law degrees, Murphy was politically and socially active and was involved in the Students' Chemistry Society, the Junior Science Association, and the Science Association. 

In 1944, in his third year of his science degree, Murphy was elected to the Students' Representative Council but was dismissed two hours after his election victory, on a "constitutional technicality". This event is said to have cemented his interest in politics and law, and he commenced participating in the university's debating society and its monthly debates the following year.

Legal career
Unusually, two years prior to his graduating with and possessing a law degree, Murphy passed the Barristers' Admission Board examination and was admitted to the New South Wales Bar Association in 1947. After graduating from the University of Sydney Faculty of Law, Murphy took up residence in University Chambers, Phillip Street and then moved to the fourth floor of Wentworth Chambers. He rapidly established himself as a labour/industrial lawyer, representing left-wing unionists.

In 1960, he was appointed as a Queen's Counsel.

Parliamentary career
Murphy was a member of the Australian Labor Party from an early age. In the Senate pre-selection convention in the Sydney Trades Hall in April 1960, he had the backing of Ray Gietzelt but lacked factional endorsement. However, he drew first position in addressing the delegates and won support with an impassioned but well-structured and infectiously optimistic seven-minute speech on the Labor Party's historical commitment to civil liberties and human rights. He was elected to the Australian Senate in 1961, and, in 1967, he was elected Opposition Leader in the Senate.

Attorney-Generalship

In 1969, Labor Leader Gough Whitlam appointed him Shadow Attorney-General and, when Labor won the 1972 election, he became Attorney-General and Minister for Customs and Excise. One of Murphy's more dramatic actions as Attorney-General was his sudden visit to the Melbourne headquarters of the Australian Security Intelligence Organisation (ASIO) on 16 March 1973. This came about because ASIO officers were unable to satisfy his requests for information concerning intelligence on supposed terrorist groups operated by the Ustaše in Australia. Murphy's concern about the matter was heightened by the impending visit to Australia of the Yugoslav Prime Minister Džemal Bijedić. ASIO officers claimed not to be able to locate the file with which to properly brief Murphy. Murphy's belief was that, though a security service was an important part of the Australian social fabric, like any other arm of executive government it must be accountable to the relevant Minister. According to journalist George Negus, then Murphy's press secretary: "Lionel had asked for the files of the six most dangerous or subversive people in Australia". When the files arrived, Murphy found they were of several Communist Party (CPA) unionists and people such as CPA leader and peace movement activist Mavis Robertson. When he told Whitlam, they both laughed.

Murphy was highly involved in the behind-the-scenes machinations and parliamentary debates around the appointment of DLP Senator Vince Gair as Ambassador to Ireland in 1974 (see Gair Affair), which preceded Whitlam's calling of a double dissolution election for May 1974.

Murphy's most important legislative achievement was the Family Law Act 1975, which completely overhauled Australia's law on divorce and other family law matters. It established the principle of "no-fault divorce", in the face of opposition from the Roman Catholic Church and many other individuals and organisations. This act also established the Family Court of Australia.

Civil Celebrants
Murphy used an existing provision of the Marriage Act 1961 (Section 39C) to establish the Civil Marriage Celebrant programme. Using this provision he appointed about a hundred Civil Celebrants and urged them to provide marriage ceremonies of dignity, meaning and substance for non-church people. It was an initiative opposed by the Australian Labor Party, the public servants of his department and his personal staff. 
The civil celebrant program is almost entirely the result of one man’s vision. Murphy himself told me the story of how he was opposed by his own staff, the public service, his fellow Members of Parliament s and officials of the Labour Party. He defied all, and, on July 19, 1973, in the dead of night typed the first appointment himself, found the envelope and stamp, walked to a post box and posted it himself. Lois D’Arcy, carries the honour of being appointed the first genuinely independent civil celebrant in Australia, and actually in all the world.
Although it was a radical move at the time, the programme proved to be very successful. In 2015, 74.9 per cent of marrying couples in Australia chose a civil marriage celebrant to officiate. The programme broadened to include secular funerals of substance, namings and other ceremonies which celebrated the landmarks of human existence. Murphy took an enthusiastic interest in this programme - sending telegrams of congratulation to the first several hundred couples married by civil celebrants and would often unexpectedly turn up uninvited to weddings performed by celebrants to delight in his achievement.

Human Rights Bill

As Attorney-General, Murphy drew up a Human Rights Bill (which lapsed with the double dissolution of 1974) giving as among the reasons: "in criminal law, our protections against detention for interrogation and unreasonable search and seizure, for access to counsel and to ensure the segregation of different categories of prisoners are inadequate. Australian laws on the powers of the police, the rights of an accused person and the state of the penal system generally are unsatisfactory. Our privacy laws are vague and ineffective. There are few effective constraints on the gathering of information, or its disclosure, or surveillance, against unwanted publicity by government, the media or commercial organisations". Murphy also introduced important legislation substantially abolishing appeals to the Judicial Committee of the Privy Council, removing censorship, providing freedom of access to government information, reforming corporations and trade practices law, protecting the environment, abolishing the death penalty and outlawing racial and other discrimination.

Furthermore, Murphy established a systematic legal aid service for all courts, set up the Australian Law Reform Commission with Michael Kirby as its inaugural chairman and set up the Australian Institute of Criminology.

Murphy took the French Government to the International Court of Justice (ICJ) to protest against its nuclear tests in the Pacific. The French government conducted 41 atmospheric nuclear tests at Mururoa after 1966 and formally ceased atmospheric nuclear testing in 1974 as a result of public pressure facilitated by Murphy's ICJ case.

Judicial career

In February 1975, Whitlam appointed Murphy to a vacancy on the High Court of Australia. He was the first serving Labor politician appointed to the Court since Dr. H. V. Evatt in 1931 and the appointment was bitterly criticised. He resigned from the Senate on 9 February 1975 to take up the appointment. Murphy was the last High Court justice to have served as a Member of Parliament, and the last politician appointed to the High Court. Additionally, Murphy was one of only eight justices of the High Court to have served in the Parliament of Australia prior to his appointment to the Court, along with Edmund Barton, Richard O'Connor, Isaac Isaacs, H. B. Higgins, Edward McTiernan, John Latham, and Garfield Barwick.

Although it did not become a constitutional requirement until 1977, it had been long-standing convention that a Senate casual vacancy be filled by a person from the same political party. However, on 27 February 1975, the Premier of New South Wales, Tom Lewis, controversially appointed Cleaver Bunton, a person with no political affiliations, to replace Murphy in the Senate, beginning the chain of events which led to the 1975 Australian constitutional crisis. These events provided the impetus for the 1977 constitutional change that ensures such an appointment cannot be repeated, although a State Government can still achieve a similar result by declining to fill a Senate vacancy. Soon after his appointment to the bench, Murphy visited Justice Menzies' old chambers in Taylor Square, which would now be his. Staring at the volumes of British law reports on the shelves behind his desk, he said, "I want all of these to go". He replaced them with decisions from the Supreme Court of the United States.

Court cases and death
In the summer of 1983/84, during the term of the first Hawke government, both The National Times and The Age  published transcripts of telephone conversations illegally recorded from 1979-81 by the New South Wales Police. Although not then authenticated, they were allegedly between Murphy and Sydney lawyer Morgan Ryan, who in 1982 faced charges of forgery and conspiracy.

In July 1985, Murphy was initially convicted on one of two charges of attempting to pervert the course of justice, over new allegations made by Clarrie Briese, the Chief Magistrate of New South Wales, that Murphy had attempted to influence a court case against Morgan Ryan, whom Murphy referred to as "my little mate". A subsequent appeal to the NSW Court of Appeals quashed Murphy's conviction on the grounds that the trial judge had misdirected the jury. A second trial was then held and, on 28 April 1986, Murphy was found not guilty of attempting to pervert the course of justice. After his acquittal, Murphy said, "Thank heavens for the jury system!".

Attorney-General Lionel Bowen, acting on what he said was his belief that the Justices of the High Court were minded to take some independent action to assess Justice Murphy's fitness to return to the Court, introduced legislation for a Parliamentary Commission of Inquiry, consisting of three retired judges, to examine "whether any conduct of the Honourable Lionel Keith Murphy has been such as to amount, in its opinion, to proved misbehaviour within the meaning of section 72 of the Constitution". (Section 72 specifies that a High Court judge may be removed only by the Governor-General and both houses of Parliament "on the ground of proved misbehaviour or incapacity".) The terms of this inquiry specifically excluded the issues for which Murphy had already been tried and acquitted.

The legislation establishing the Commission of Inquiry received assent in May 1986. In July, Murphy announced that he was dying of terminal cancer, and the establishing legislation was repealed. The Speaker of the House of Representatives and the President of the Senate were given control of the Commission's documents. Murphy returned to the Court for one week of sittings. He died on 21 October 1986.

Personal life
Murphy had a distinctive profile and a large nose that was broken in a 1950 car accident in England and left largely untreated.

In July 1954, he married Russian-born Nina Morrow (née Vishegorodsky; known as Svidersky), a comptometrist, at St John's Church in Darlinghurst, Sydney. Their daughter, Lorel Katherine, was born in 1955. In 1967, Murphy's marriage to Nina ended in divorce.

In 1969, Murphy married Ingrid Gee (née Grzonkowski), a model and television quiz-show compère who had been born in German-occupied Poland. They had two sons, Cameron and Blake. Cameron was President of the New South Wales Council for Civil Liberties from 1999 to 2013. Ingrid died in October 2007.

In 2021, the ABC investigative series Exposed: The Ghost Train Fire aired an allegation that Murphy and NSW Premier Neville Wran had conspired with  organised crime figure Abe Saffron to help Saffron’s relatives obtain the Luna Park lease after the 1979 Sydney Ghost Train fire, which caused the deaths of six children and an adult.

Judicial quotes

Australian Aboriginal history:

Freedom of religion:

Freedom of speech:

Trial by jury:

Preservation of the world's natural heritage:

Constitutional prohibition of slavery:

Constitutional prohibition on civil conscription for medical or dental services:

Common heritage of humanity:

Theory of class struggle:

Right to vote:

Privilege against self-incrimination:

Legal professional privilege:

Acquisition of property on just terms:

Control of multinational corporations:

Legacy

In addition to his work as a legislator, Murphy also took a lifelong interest in science, having first studied science, then law, at the University of Sydney. Justice Michael Kirby identified Murphy's later scientific reading as "a positive influence on his approach to jurisprudence".

"Lionel Murphy SNR"
N86 is a nitrogen-abundant supernova remnant (SNR) N86 in the Large Magellanic Cloud.  It was dubbed the "Lionel-Murphy SNR" by astronomers at the Australian National University's Mount Stromlo Observatory in acknowledgement of Murphy's interest in science and because of SNR N86's perceived resemblance to a Canberra Times cartoonist's depiction of his large nose (prior to surgery), and a picture was hung in his office.

A supernova remnant (SNR) results from the gigantic explosion of a star, the resulting supernova expelling much or all of the stellar material with velocities as much as 1% the speed of light and forming a shock wave that can heat the gas up to temperatures as high as 10 million K, forming a plasma.

Murphy normally rejected public honours (such as a knighthood) but accepted this because of the symbolic resemblance to his own impact on human rights in Australian law and its lasting significance as a "signpost" to space travellers. Murphy asked for a large mounted photo of SNR N86 from the scientific paper and placed it in his High Court chambers in the place where the other High Court justices usually hung a portrait of the Queen.

Lionel Murphy Foundation
The Lionel Murphy Foundation was co-founded by Gough Whitlam, Neville Wran, and Ray Gietzelt in 1986. It funds postgraduate scholarships for students who "intend to pursue a postgraduate degree in science, law or legal studies, or other appropriate discipline" with a commitment to social justice.

Judicial philosophy and legacy
Mary Gaudron, who herself would become a justice of the High Court, stated at Lionel Murphy's Memorial Service at Sydney Town Hall:
There are so many words – reformist, radical, humanitarian, civil libertarian, egalitarian, democrat — they are all abstractions. My words are no better; but, for me, and perhaps for those of us who believe in justice based on practical equality, Lionel Murphy was – Lionel Murphy is – the electric light of the Law. He would take an ordinary old abstraction – like equal justice — he would expose it, he would illuminate the abstraction, he would make its form stark, and so he could then say as he did in McInnis' case, these words: "Where the kind of trial a person receives depends on the amount of money he or she has, there is no equal justice".

Law professor Jack Goldring concluded that Murphy's approach as a High Court judge was "marked by a number of features: a strong nationalism conceding and welcoming the existence of States as political (albeit subsidiary) entities; a stalwart belief in democracy and parliamentary rule; a firm support for civil liberties; and overall a 'constitutionalism' in the classical, liberal sense of seeing a constitution as not simply a legal document, but rather as a set of values shared by the community".

Notes

Books and a film on Lionel Murphy
 Lionel Murphy – a Political Biography
 Five Voices for Lionel
 In the Name of Lionel
 The Judgments of Lionel Murphy
 Justice Lionel Murphy
 Lionel Murphy: A Radical Judge
 FILM: Mr Neal is entitled to be an Agitator

References

Bibliography

External links
 Lionel Murphy Foundation
 Whitmont, Debbie; Ferguson, Sarah. The Murphy Scandal. ABC Four Corners, 20 November 2017
 Mr Neal is Entitled to be an Agitator 58 min documentary film about the life of Lionel Murphy. DVD. Dir: Daryl Dellora. Australian Human Rights Award.
 Justice Lionel Murphy address to Press Club of Australia, 17 August 1983
 The Hon. Justice Lionel Murphy QC Speeches

1922 births
1975 Australian constitutional crisis
1986 deaths
Attorneys-General of Australia
Australian humanists
Australian Labor Party members of the Parliament of Australia
Australian people of Irish descent
Australian King's Counsel
Deaths from cancer in the Australian Capital Territory
Justices of the High Court of Australia
Labor Left politicians
Members of the Australian Senate
Members of the Australian Senate for New South Wales
People educated at Sydney Boys High School
Sydney Law School alumni
University of Sydney alumni
20th-century Australian judges
20th-century Australian lawyers
20th-century Australian politicians